Henry Nicol Blackadar (1803 – November 22, 1852) was a lawyer and political figure in Nova Scotia, Canada. He represented Pictou County from 1840 to 1843 and Pictou township from 1845 to 1851 in the Nova Scotia House of Assembly.

He was baptized in Halifax in December 1803, the son of Charles Blackadar. He began practising as a lawyer around 1825. Blackadar died in Pictou at the age of 48.

References
 A Directory of the Members of the Legislative Assembly of Nova Scotia, 1758-1958, Public Archives of Nova Scotia (1958)

1803 births
1852 deaths
Nova Scotia pre-Confederation MLAs
Place of birth missing